Slavoljub Filipović (born 1951) is a former politician in Serbia. He served in the National Assembly of Serbia from 1993 to 1997 as a member of the Serbian Renewal Movement (Srpski pokret obnove, SPO).

Private career
In the 1993 Serbian election, Filipović identified as a gallerist based in Jagodina.

Politician
Filipović was a founding member of the Serbian Renewal Movement in 1990. The party contested the 1992 Serbian parliamentary election as part of the Democratic Movement of Serbia (Demokratski pokret Srbije, DEPOS) coalition, and Filipović appeared in the sixth position on the coalition's electoral list in the Smederevo division. The list won five seats, and he was included in his party's delegation when the assembly convened in early 1993. (From 1992 to 2000, Serbia's electoral law stipulated that one-third of parliamentary mandates would be assigned to candidates on successful lists in numerical order, while the remaining two-thirds would be distributed amongst other candidates at the discretion of the sponsoring parties or coalitions. Filipović's relatively low position did not prevent him from receiving a mandate.) The Socialist Party of Serbia (Socijalistička partija Srbije, SPS) won the election, and the SPO served in opposition.

Filipović was promoted to the third position on the DEPOS list for Smederevo in the 1993 Serbian parliamentary election; the list again won five mandates, and he was given a mandate for a second term. The Socialists again won the election, and the SPO continued to serve in opposition. In 1994, Filipović complained about police inaction (or complicity) in the face of fuel and cigarette smuggling by organized crime networks. He was not a candidate in the 1997 Serbian election.

In October 1997, Filipović was expelled from the SPO under extremely acrimonious circumstances. In leaving the party's assembly, he accused his former colleagues of being "communists." His rivals, in turn, taunted him as having been a spy for the Democratic Party (Demokratska stranka, DS).

He later became reconciled to the SPO at least on a local level after the fall of Slobodan Milošević's administration and was the party's candidate for mayor of Jagodina in the 2004 Serbian local elections. He was defeated in the first round of voting.

Electoral record

Municipal (Jagodina)

References

1951 births
Living people
People from Jagodina
Members of the National Assembly (Serbia)
Serbian Renewal Movement politicians